Carroll County Airport  is a county-owned, public-use airport in Carroll County, Arkansas, United States. It is located three nautical miles (6 km) west of the central business district of Berryville, Arkansas. This airport is included in the National Plan of Integrated Airport Systems for 2011–2015, which categorized it as a general aviation facility.

Facilities and aircraft 
Carroll County Airport covers an area of 51 acres (21 ha) at an elevation of 1,206 feet (368 m) above mean sea level. It has one runway designated 7/25 with an asphalt surface measuring 3,554 by 75 feet (1,083 x 23 m).

For the 12-month period ending July 31, 2012, the airport had 21,200 aircraft operations, an average of 58 per day: 99% general aviation and 1% military. At that time there were 29 aircraft based at this airport: 72% single-engine, 17% ultralight, 7% jet, and 3% multi-engine.

References

External links 
 Carroll County Airport, official site
 Carroll County (4M1) at Arkansas Department of Aeronautics
 Aerial photo as of February 2001 from USGS The National Map
 
 
 

Airports in Arkansas
Transportation in Carroll County, Arkansas
Buildings and structures in Berryville, Arkansas